Roberto Garcia Cortez (born January 29, 1975) is an American former professional boxer who competed from 1992 to 2001, and held the IBF junior lightweight title from 1998 to 1999. He has since worked as a boxing trainer, and was voted Trainer of the Year by The Ring magazine in 2011, and by the Boxing Writers Association of America in 2012. He is the older brother of professional boxer Mikey Garcia, who is a world champion in four weight classes.

Early life
Born in San Pedro, Los Angeles, Garcia grew up and still resides in Oxnard, California, and was trained by his father Eduardo Garcia at the La Colonia Youth Boxing Club. Garcia said that he has been in Oxnard, California, since he was two years old. He considers himself to be Mexican, and has said that his father and mother are both of Mexican descent. He said that his parents were illegal immigrants until the eighties. He said that he grew up speaking Spanish, and that he learned to speak English when he went to school.

Amateur career
Garcia had an extensive amateur career, which included a fight with future Olympic gold medalist Oscar De La Hoya.

Professional career
Known as "Grandpa", Garcia won his pro debut against Tsutomu Hitono at the International Center in Fukuoka, Japan. He accumulated a record of 20–0, which included a win against future champion Derrick Gainer, before challenging for his first regional title.

NABF super featherweight champion
In 1995 he took down the previously unbeaten American Julian Wheeler to win his first belt, the NABF Super Featherweight Championship. He successfully defended his championship just three months later against Francisco Segura.

NABF featherweight champion
At the Miami Arena, Garcia moved down to Featherweight and beat Darryl Pinckney to win the NABF Featherweight Championship.

IBF super featherweight champion
On March 13, 1998 a then undefeated Garcia (29–0) captured the vacant IBF Super Featherweight Championship with a unanimous decision win over Harold Warren. In his first title defense he knocked out Cuban Ramon Ledon at the Trump Taj Mahal, Atlantic City, New Jersey.

His next fight was against two-time World Champion, Puerto Rico's John John Molina. Garcia defeated Molina over twelve rounds; that fight card also featured Mike Tyson, Zab Judah, and Fres Oquendo. 
He lost the belt in an upset to rising undefeated phenom Diego Corrales. After a win over title contender Sandro Marcos he moved back up in the world rankings.

WBA super featherweight title challenge and retirement

In January 2001, he earned a shot at the undefeated WBA Super Featherweight champion Joel Casamayor. Casamayor won the fight and Garcia retired shortly after beating veteran John Trigg by knockout.

Training career
Garcia formally worked as a trainer at La Colonia Gym in Oxnard, California.  Notable fighters who have trained under Garcia include Nonito Donaire and Tony Ferguson. Most recently he opened his own boxing gym named Robert Garcia Boxing Academy in Oxnard, California.

Notable boxers trained
Christopher Algieri, former WBO World Light Welterweight Champion
Allan Benitez, Lightweight boxer
Alfonso Blanco, Light Middleweight prospect
Felipe Campa, former WBC Youth World Super Bantamweight Champion
Francisco Contreras, Lightweight contender
Jesus Cuellar, former WBA Fedelatin Featherweight Champion
Nonito Donaire, world champion in four weight classes and former Ring Magazine pound for pound fighter
Irving García, Lightweight journeyman
Mikey Garcia, world champion in four weight classes
Alfonso Gómez, competitor on The Contender
Evgeny Gradovich, former IBF Featherweight Champion
Joan Guzmán, former two divisions WBO World Champion
Egidijus Kavaliauskas, established former amateur and welterweight title challenger
Steven Luevano, former WBO World Featherweight Champion; made five successful defenses
Marcos Maidana, former WBA Welterweight Champion and former WBA Light Welterweight champion
Abner Mares, current WBA regular featherweight champion
Antonio Margarito, former two-time World Welterweight Champion
Hernán Márquez, former WBA World Flyweight Champion
Hanzel Martínez, Bantamweight boxer; brother-in-law of Antonio Margarito
Victor Ortíz, former WBC welterweight champion
Victor Pasillas, undefeated Featherweight prospect
Kelly Pavlik, former Lineal Middleweight Champion
Manuel Quezada, Heavyweight journeyman
Marcos Reyes, Middleweight boxer
Brandon Ríos, former WBA World Lightweight Champion
Marco Antonio Rubio, former WBF World Super Middleweight Champion
Erik Ruiz, Super Bantamweight journeyman
Mia St. John, former WIBA, WIBF Lightweight, and WBC Light Middleweight Champion
Mark Suárez, former WBO NABO Welterweight Champion
Fernando Vargas, former two-time World Light Middleweight Champion
Brian Viloria, former WBC and IBF Light Flyweight Champion
Joshua Franco, current WBA Super Flyweight Champion
Jesse Rodriguez, current WBC Superweight Champion
Anthony Joshua, former two-time WBA Heavyweight, IBF Heavyweight, WBO Heavyweight, IBO Heavyweight

Professional boxing record

See also
List of Mexican boxing world champions
List of super-featherweight boxing champions
List of IBF world champions
Notable boxing families

References

External links
 RingTV poll: Trainer of the Year: Robert Garcia by The Ring magazine

Living people
1975 births
American boxers of Mexican descent
Boxers from Los Angeles
Sportspeople from Oxnard, California
World boxing champions
International Boxing Federation champions
World super-featherweight boxing champions
American boxing trainers
American male boxers
Featherweight boxers
Super-featherweight boxers
Sportspeople from Ventura County, California